The 1998 Cordillera Autonomy plebiscite was held on March 7, 1998. In the plebiscite, the people of Cordillera were asked if they wanted to be autonomous region under Republic Act No. 8438. The Cordillera Administrative Region (CAR) consists of the provinces of Abra, Benguet, Ifugao, Kalinga, Mountain Province and Apayao.

Results
Majority of Cordillera voters rejected the plan to be an autonomous region. For them, it will affect their families, livelihood, and cause terrorism due to Conrado Balweg and the New People's Army (NPA).

Only Apayao voted for autonomy, but due to the Supreme Court decision in 1990 disallowing an autonomous region composed of only one province, the autonomous region was not created. Because of the plebiscite, President Fidel V. Ramos amended the autonomous region proposal to a regular administrative region before he finished his term of office.

Per locality

See also
Commission on Elections
Politics of the Philippines
Philippine elections

References

Regional plebiscites in the Philippines
1998 elections in the Philippines
1998 referendums
Autonomy referendums
Presidency of Fidel V. Ramos
Politics of the Cordillera Administrative Region